The Brabham BT45 was a Formula One car designed by South African engineer Gordon Murray for the 1976 Formula One season.

Technology 

It was equipped with a Hewland six-speed transmission. It used the front air intakes of the previous Brabham, but by regulation no longer has the air-brooms behind the cockpit and has side panels with larger air intakes to feed the engine and more radiant surfaces. The frame was an aluminum monocoque, while the braking system was constituted by ventilated disc brakes produced by Girling. The front suspension consisted of double wishbones with pull-rods, coil springs and stabilizer bars, while the rear used coil springs and stabilizer bars.
For the  season, pending the development of BT46, a C version of the BT45 was created. This model was equipped with a revised radiator.

Races 

The BT45 had its first start at the 1976 Brazilian Grand Prix in the hands of Carlos Pace and Carlos Reutemann. They suffered reliability problems, especially the engine. During the first season, the best results were three fourth places.

 was better: Pace finished second in the first race and led for thirteen laps in South Africa with the BT45B, unluckily he died a few days later in a plane crash. His teammate, John Watson, drove to the pole at the Monaco Grand Prix but was passed on the first lap by Jody Scheckter's Wolf, after that he spent more than half of the race in second position, before retiring with gearbox problems. He then took second place in France, and Stuck gained two podiums, in Germany and Austria. Its results allowed the German to finish 11th overall in the Championship.

With this latest release, Niki Lauda achieved two podiums. Jackie Stewart tested an early BT45C (chassis number 8) in 1978 and returned an overall favourable impression of the car as well as the team, with the smooth, torquey Alfa Romeo flat-twelve and the Brabham gearbox coming in for particular praise. The chassis was not yet fully sorted and Stewart disliked the cable-operated clutch; but the Brabham was still the fastest car he ran in a series of tests at Paul Ricard.

Complete Formula One World Championship results
(key) (results in bold indicate pole position, results in italics indicate fastest lap)

 This total includes points scored using the Brabham BT46.

References

Brabham Formula One cars
1976 Formula One season cars
1977 Formula One season cars
1978 Formula One season cars
Cars powered by boxer engines